Glenthorne High School is a non-selective mixed secondary school and sixth form located in the Sutton Common area of Sutton in the London Borough of Sutton, England.

History
The school was first established in 1933 on Glastonbury Road in Sutton. It moved to the Sutton Common Road site in 1958, and at this time was called Sutton Common County Secondary Girls' School. The school changed its name to Glenthorne in 1982, and in 1993 it became coeducational. The school was converted to academy status in July 2011, and was previously a foundation school administered by Sutton London Borough Council. The schools continues to coordinate with Sutton London Borough Council for admissions.

Academics
Glenthorne High School offers GCSEs, BTECs, OCR Nationals and vocational courses as programmes of study for pupils, while students in the sixth form have the option to study a range of A Levels and further BTECs. The school specialises in the arts and has dedicated resources and facilities to support the specialism.

The school also offers extra-vocational facilities such as clubs. The school librarian is Lucas Maxwell, who was named Librarian of the Year in 2017 by the School Library Association.

In popular culture
In 2020 the school was in the Channel 4 documentary “The School That Tried To End Racism”. The documentary followed a group of 11 and 12 year olds and attempted to expand their knowledge of racism and white privilege.

References

External links
Glenthorne High School official website

Secondary schools in the London Borough of Sutton
Educational institutions established in 1933
1933 establishments in England
Academies in the London Borough of Sutton
Sutton, London